The Uzbekistan National Road Race Championship is a road bicycle race that takes place inside the Uzbekistan National Cycling Championship, and decides the best cyclist in this type of race. The first edition took place in 1998, and was won by Sergei Arkov. The current champions are Akramjon Sunnatov and Shaknoza Abdullaeva.

Multiple winners
Men

Women

Men

Women

References

External links
National Championship, Road, Elite, Uzbekistan (M)
National Championship, Road, Elite, Uzbekistan (F)

National road cycling championships
Cycle races in Uzbekistan
Road race